This is a list of archives in South Sudan.

Archives in South Sudan 

 National Archives of South Sudan

External links 
 The Sudan Open Archive (SOA)

 
South Sudan
Archives